Father's Doing Fine is a 1952 British comedy film directed by Henry Cass and starring Richard Attenborough, Heather Thatcher, and Noel Purcell, and featuring Sid James. It was based on the 1948 play Little Lambs Eat Ivy by Noel Langley. It was shot at Associated British's Elstree Studios with sets designed by the art director Donald M. Ashton.

Plot
Eccentric widow Lady Buckering lives in splendour in Hampstead, but behind the scenes is struggling with poverty and bringing up four demanding daughters, one of whom is about to have a baby. Also of concern is the very nervous father-to-be and how exactly to deal with her light-fingered butler.

Cast
 Richard Attenborough as Dougall
 Heather Thatcher as Lady Buckering
 Noel Purcell as Shaughnessy
 George Thorpe as Dr Drew
 Diane Hart as Doreen
 Susan Stephen as Bicky
 Mary Germaine as Gerda
 Virginia McKenna as Catherine
 Jack Watling as Clifford Magill
 Peter Hammond as Roly
 Brian Worth as Wilfred
 Sid James as Taxi Driver
 Ambrosine Phillpotts as Nurse Pynegar
 Wensley Pithey as Police Constable
 Jonathan Field as Zookeeper
 Harry Locke as Father in Zoo

Critical reception
TV Guide called it a "Fast-moving, barely plotted comedy," and "Unpretentious entertainment"; while the Radio Times wrote "such is the precision of Henry Cass's direction and the exuberance of the performances that it's difficult not to be sucked into this frantic world of scatterbrained daughters, disastrous share deals and crooked butlers," concluding that "The pace disguises the fact that the humour has dated somewhat, but there's rarely a dull moment."

References

External links

1952 films
Films shot at Associated British Studios
Films directed by Henry Cass
1952 romantic comedy films
British romantic comedy films
Films with screenplays by Noel Langley
Films set in London
British films based on plays
1950s English-language films
1950s British films